Oven Studios is the personal recording studio of American singer-songwriter and record producer Alicia Keys, located in the Chelsea neighborhood in Manhattan, New York.

Background 
Designed by the Walters-Storyk Design Group, the studio was originally located at 186 Glen Cove Ave., Glen Cove N.Y. on the North Shore of Nassau County, Long Island. It features a grand piano and two isolation booths. Keys says the building is reminiscent of her grandmother's house and has decorated the walls of the studios to include pictures of Nina Simone, Janis Joplin and Bob Marley. Opened in 2005, Keys co-owns the studio with her production and songwriting partner Kerry "Krucial" Brothers. According to Walters-Storyk, the design was important to the acoustics of the building:

The studio was relocated to New York City by the recording of Keys' fourth album The Element of Freedom (2009).

Recordings at Oven

Albums 
Adapted from Discogs

Alicia Keys—As I Am (2007)
Alicia Keys—The Element of Freedom (2009)
Sex and the City - Original Motion Picture Soundtrack (2010)
Nas—Life Is Good (2012)
Alicia Keys—Girl on Fire (2012)
Beyoncé—Beyoncé (2013)
 Ella Henderson - Chapter One (2014)
Alicia Keys—Here (2016)
Alicia Keys—Alicia (2020)

Songs 
"Don't Give Up (Africa)" (2005) by Alicia Keys and Bono
"Empire State of Mind" (2009) by Jay Z and Alicia Keys
"Million Dollar Bill" (2009) by Whitney Houston
"It's On Again" (2014) by Alicia Keys featuring Kendrick Lamar and Hans Zimmer

References

Recording studios in Manhattan
Alicia Keys